Kaj Kush (also Romanized as Kaj Kūsh; also known as Kach Kūsh) is a village in Damen Rural District, in the Central District of Iranshahr County, Sistan and Baluchestan Province, Iran. At the 2006 census, its population was 412, in 75 families.

References 

Populated places in Iranshahr County